The 2015 Euroleague Final Four was the concluding EuroLeague Final Four tournament of the 2014–15 Euroleague season. The Final Four was held on 15 and 17 May 2015. All of the games were played at the Barclaycard Center, in Madrid, Spain. It was the third time the city of Madrid hosted the Final Four, and the 6th time the Final of the EuroLeague was played there.

Real Madrid won its 9th EuroLeague title, after they beat Olympiacos, by a score of 78–59. CSKA Moscow took the third place, while Fenerbahçe Ülker finished in fourth.

Road to the Final Four

Bracket

Semifinals
All times are CEST (UTC+2).

CSKA Moscow vs. Olympiacos
CSKA Moscow came into the semifinals, widely considered to be the favourite. It was a rematch of the 2012 Final and 2013 Semifinal. Both of those previous games were won by Olympiacos.

Olympiacos rallied late in the fourth quarter, after it had been down by 9 with four minutes to go. Vassilis Spanoulis came up clutch, as he scored 11 points in the fourth quarter, to pull Olympiacos away from CSKA. Aaron Jackson set a Final Four record during the game, with 7 steals.

Real Madrid vs. Fenerbahçe Ülker
The hosts, Real Madrid, were considered the favourites to win the game against Fenerbahçe, which made its Final Four debut.

Real Madrid dominated in the first half, and they led 55–35 at halftime. A fourth quarter rally by Fenerbahçe came up too little, too late. Gustavo Ayón was top scorer for Real, with 18 points. Andrew Goudelock scored 26 for Fenerbahçe.

Third place game

Championship game
The game was a re-match of the 2013 Euroleague Final and the 1995 FIBA European League Final.

See also
2015 Eurocup Finals
2015 EuroChallenge Final Four

References

External links
EuroLeague website

Final Four
2014-15
2014–15 in Greek basketball
2014–15 in Russian basketball
2014–15 in Spanish basketball
2014–15 in Turkish basketball
International basketball competitions hosted by Spain
Sports competitions in Madrid
2015 in Madrid